Charles Gordon, 4th Earl of Aboyne (c. 1726 – 28 December 1794). The eldest son of John Gordon, 3rd Earl of Aboyne and Grace Lockhart, he succeeded his father as 4th Earl of Aboyne on 7 April 1732. On his death in 1794 he was succeeded in his titles by his eldest son.

His family home was Aboyne Castle, but he had an Edinburgh townhouse in the newly built St Andrews Square in the New Town.

Family
He married firstly, Lady Margaret Stewart, daughter of Alexander Stewart, 6th Earl of Galloway and Lady Catherine Cochrane, on 22 April 1759, and had issue:
Lady Catherine Gordon (1760–1764), died in infancy, buried in Restalrig churchyard
George Gordon, 9th Marquess of Huntly (1761–1853)
Lady Margaret Gordon (c. 1763–86), married William Beckford (1783)
His first wife died on 12 August 1762.

He married secondly, Lady Mary Douglas, daughter of James Douglas, 14th Earl of Morton and Agatha Halyburton, on 13 April 1774, and had issue:
Lord Douglas Gordon (1777–1841)

Notes

References
Kidd, Charles, Williamson, David (editors). Debrett's Peerage and Baronetage (2003 edition). London: Pan Macmillan, 2003., 

Cracroft's Peerage

1726 births
1794 deaths
Earls of Aboyne